Superior ramus may refer to:
 Superior ramus of the ischium
 Superior pubic ramus